Albunione is a genus of Isopoda parasites, in the family Bopyridae, containing the following species:

Albunione australiana Markham & Boyko, 1999
Albunione indecora Markham, 1988
Albunione yoda Markham & Boyko, 2003

References 

Isopoda
Cymothoida